Gregory R. Bennett is a space flight engineer and science fiction writer. 
He founded the Artemis Project in 1994.

Publications

Science Fiction Stories
 Fish Tank (June 95)
 The Last Plague	(April 94)
 Protocol (Mid-Dec 93)
 Swan Song (Aug 93)
 Tinker's Spectacles (Jun 93)

Other works
 The Artemis Project: Selling the Moon (January 1995)
 Toward [space] station operability (November 1988)
 EVA Design Integration for Space Station Assemble AEROTECH 88/SAE (Oct 3-6, 1988)
 Space Station Operations in the Twenty-First Century (1986)
 Manned Space Flight Operations Analysis (1985)
 Space Station Yesterday and Tomorrow (1984)
 SST Handling Qualities (1975)

References

External links

American science fiction writers
American short story writers
1950 births
Living people
American aerospace engineers
American male short story writers
American male novelists